Issoria smaragdifera, the African queen fritillary, is a butterfly in the family Nymphalidae. It is found in Tanzania, Malawi, Zambia and Zimbabwe. The habitat consists of montane grassland on the edges of montane forests.

Adults are on wing year round.

The larvae feed on Viola abyssinica.

Subspecies
Issoria smaragdifera smaragdifera (highlands of Malawi, eastern Zambia, eastern Zimbabwe)
Issoria smaragdifera reducta Carcasson, 1961 (southern highlands of Tanzania and possibly Zambia)

References

Butterflies described in 1895
Issoria
Butterflies of Africa